Thaketa Township is located in the eastern part of Yangon, Myanmar. The township  comprises 19 wards, and shares borders with Thingangyun Township in the north and west, the Bago River in the east, and Dawbon Township in the south. The Pazundaung Creek flows through the township. Founded in 1959, Thaketa is made up largely of middle-class and working-class neighborhoods.

5 South Korean companies have teamed up to build a 500-megawatt gas-fired combined cycle power plant in Thaketa Township to supply electricity to Thilawa Special Economic Zone.

History

In 1958, Thaketa township is founded by Yangon Mayor Colonel Htun Sein during General Ne Win's Care taker government of Myanmar(Burma) in order to relocate illegal slams in Yangon. It is built on the peninsula of Pazundaung Creek and Nga Moe Yeik creek in eastern part of Yangon.

Population 
As of 2014, Thaketa Township has 220,556 residents with 48.6% male residents and 51.4% female residents which means majority of the population is female residents.

Education
The township has nine monastic schools, 46 primary schools, eight middle schools and five high schools.

References

Townships of Yangon